Antonio Miguel Díaz Rodríguez (born 24 August 1968 in Alhendin) is a Spanish former cyclist.

Career achievements

Major results
1986
 1st  Road race, National Junior Road Championships
1991
 1st Stage 18 Vuelta a España
 4th Overall Vuelta a Aragón
1993
 1st Stage 6 Volta a Portugal

Grand Tour general classification results timeline

References

External links
 

1968 births
Living people
Spanish male cyclists
Spanish Vuelta a España stage winners
Sportspeople from the Province of Granada
Cyclists from Andalusia